Long Beach, California, held an election for mayor on April 10, 2018. It saw the reelection of Dr. Robert Garcia.

Since Garcia won a majority in the first round, no runoff was needed. Turnout was low, at 15.1%.

Municipal elections in California are officially non-partisan.

Results

References 

Long Beach
Mayoral elections in Long Beach, California
Long Beach